The 2008 Silver Helmet (BK) is the 2008 version of Silver Helmet organized by the Polish Motor Union (PZM).

The Final took place on October 10, 2008 in Rzeszów.

Calendar

Semi-finals

Final 
Final
2008-10-10
 Rzeszów
Referee:
Attendance:
Beat Time:

References

See also 
 2008 Individual Speedway Junior Polish Championship

2008
Helmet 2